Pachelma is the name of several inhabited localities in Pachelmsky District of Penza Oblast, Russia.

Urban localities
Pachelma (urban-type settlement), a work settlement

Rural localities
Pachelma (rural locality), a selo in Chkalovsky Selsoviet